Bosnia and Herzegovina fell under Austro-Hungarian rule in 1878, when the Congress of Berlin approved the occupation of the Bosnia Vilayet, which officially remained part of the Ottoman Empire. Three decades later, in 1908, Austria-Hungary provoked the Bosnian Crisis by formally annexing the occupied zone, establishing the Condominium of Bosnia and Herzegovina under the joint control of Austria and Hungary.

History

Occupation
  
Following the Russo-Turkish War (1877–1878), in June and July 1878 the Congress of Berlin was organized by the Great Powers. The resulting Treaty of Berlin caused Bosnia and Herzegovina to nominally remain under sovereignty of the Ottoman Empire, but was de facto ceded to Austria-Hungary, which also obtained the right to garrison the Sanjak of Novi Pazar. According to article 25:
The provinces of Bosnia and Herzegovina shall be occupied and administered by Austria-Hungary. The government of Austria-Hungary, not desiring to undertake the administration of the Sanjak of Novi-Pazar, which extends between Serbia and Montenegro in a South-Easterly direction to the other side of Mitrovitza, the Ottoman administration will continue to exercise its functions there. Nevertheless, in order to assure the maintenance of the new political state of affairs, as well as freedom and security of communications, Austria-Hungary reserves the right of keeping garrisons and having military and commercial roads in the whole of this part of the ancient vilayet of Bosnia. To this end the governments of Austria-Hungary and Turkey reserve to themselves to come to an understanding on the details.
The Austro-Hungarian Army engaged in a major mobilization effort to prepare for the assault on Bosnia and Herzegovina, commanding by the end of June 1878 a force of 82,113 troops, 13,313 horses and 112 cannons in the VI, VII, XX, and XVIII infantry divisions as well as a rear army in the Kingdom of Dalmatia. The primary commander was Josip Filipović; the forward XVIII infantry division was under the command Stjepan Jovanović, while the rear army commander in Dalmatia was Gavrilo Rodić. The occupation of Bosnia and Herzegovina started on 29 July 1878 and was over on 20 October.

The Ottoman army in Bosnia and Herzegovina at the time consisted of roughly 40,000 troops with 77 cannons, that combined with local militias to around 93,000 men. The Austro-Hungarian troops were occasionally met with ferocious opposition from elements of both Muslim and Orthodox populations there, and significant battles occurred near Čitluk, Stolac, Livno and Klobuk. Despite setbacks at Maglaj and Tuzla, Sarajevo was occupied in October 1878. Austro-Hungarian casualties amounted to over 5,000 and the unexpected violence of the campaign led to recriminations between commanders and political leaders. Fierce resistance from Muslims was expected as Austro-Hungarians realized their occupation meant that Bosnian Muslims would lose their privileged status based on their religion.

Tensions remained in certain parts of the country (particularly Herzegovina) and a mass emigration of predominantly Muslim dissidents occurred. However, a state of relative stability was reached soon enough and Austro-Hungarian authorities were able to embark on a number of social and administrative reforms which intended to make Bosnia and Herzegovina into a "model colony". With the aim of establishing the province as a stable political model that would help dissipate rising South Slav nationalism, Habsburg rule did much to codify laws, to introduce new political practices, and generally to provide for modernization.

Ethnic relations

The Austro-Hungarian administration advocated the ideal of a pluralist and multi-confessional Bosnian nation. Joint Imperial Minister of Finance and Vienna-based administrator of Bosnia Béni Kállay thus endorsed Bosnian nationalism in the form of Bošnjaštvo ("Bosniakhood") with the aim to inspire in Bosnia's people 'a feeling that they belong to a great and powerful nation' and viewed Bosnians as "speaking the Bosnian language and divided into three religions with equal rights.". Between 1861 and 1869, Topal Osman Pasha, an Ottoman Grand vizier had striven to do the same.

On the one hand, these policies attempted to insulate Bosnia and Herzegovina from its irredentist neighbors (Eastern Orthodox Serbia, Catholic Croatia, and the Muslim Ottoman Empire) and to marginalize the already circulating ideas of Serbian and Croatian nationhood among Bosnia's Orthodox and Catholic communities, respectively. On the other hand, the Habsburg administrators precisely used the existing ideas of nationhood (especially Bosnian folklore and symbolism) in order to promote their own version of Bošnjak patriotism that aligned with loyalty to the Habsburg state. Habsburg policies are thus best described not as anti-national, but as cultivating their own style of pro-imperial nationalisms. This policy had mixed results. Overall, most Serb and Croat politicians ultimately ignored or opposed the policy, but Serb and Croat politicians also tried and failed to secure the allegiance of Bosnian Muslim constituencies. At the same time, Austro-Hungarian officials actively promoted Bosnia and Herzegovina as new and flourishing crownlands. Habsburg officials publicized numerous exhibits on Bosnian history, folklore, and archaeology, with artists like Alphonse Mucha presenting the Bosnian pavilion at the Paris Exposition of 1900.

The idea of a unified South Slavic state (typically expected to be spearheaded by independent Kingdom of Serbia) became a popular political ideology in the region at this time, including Bosnia and Herzegovina.

Certain Muslim circles in Bosnia and Herzegovina published the newspaper Bošnjak ("Bosniak"). This newspaper caused fierce discussions in Bosnia and Herzegovina, Croatia, and Serbia. The newspaper supported Kállay's policy, whose goal was to strengthen Austro-Hungarian rule in occupied Bosnia and Herzegovina. Although Kállay's policy was not widely accepted even amongst Muslims, Bošnjak nevertheless represented the national aspirations of some Muslims in Bosnia and Herzegovina.

Kállay's policy was finally defeated in 1896 and 1899, when Bosnian Serbs and Muslims called for religious and educational autonomy. Kállay's policy had some potential to resist Croatian and Serbian national aspirations, but after 1899 and 1900 his policy of promoting Bosnian identity had no significant effect.

After the death of Kallay, the policy was abandoned. By 1905, nationalism was an integral factor of Bosnian politics, with national political parties corresponding to the three groups dominating elections.

Soon after Austria-Hungary occupied Bosnia and Herzegovina in 1878, the government took the area's religious activities and institutions under its sovereignty. Austro-Hungarian authorities issued regulations which made Muslim clergy Austro-Hungarian state officials, answering exclusively to them. This was to isolate Bosnian Muslims from the Ottoman Empire, and its clergy who were subordinate to the Sultan. The Muslims were largely unhappy with their new status, and formed Muslim political opposition. This Muslim opposition demanded, at first, Muslim religious autonomy from Austria-Hungary, but later, as it grew stronger, they demanded autonomy from the Ottoman Empire. The Muslim opposition tried to align itself with the Serbs, who were also demanding religious and educational autonomy. But unsolved agrarian relations between the Muslim leadership and the Serbs was an obstacle to any far-reaching alliance. The alliance that did form was only tactical. Later, the Muslim leadership emphasized Ottoman sovereignty over Bosnia and Herzegovina, and demanded the right to organize their religious activity under the aegis of the Shaykh al-Islām of the Ottoman Empire.

With Kállay's death in 1903, the situation in Bosnia and Herzegovina was liberalized. The national movements in Bosnia and Herzegovina were transformed into political parties. Muslims founded the Muslim National Organization (MNO) in 1906, Serbs formed the Serbian National Organization (SNO) in 1907, and Croats formed the Croat National Union (HNZ) in 1908. Another significant Croatian party, though less represented than the HNZ, was the Croatian Catholic Association (HKU).

The MNO considered Bosnia and Herzegovina to be part of the Ottoman Empire until the collapse of Austria-Hungary in 1918. They considered Austria-Hungary a European country assigned to control Bosnia and Herzegovina. Their main goal was to achieve Muslim religious autonomy and to maintain the agrarian relations that were in force at the time. In 1909 they achieved their religious autonomy.

Textbooks printed in Serbia and a number of other Serbian-language books were banned. Austro-Hungarian authorities signed a treaty with the Ecumenical Patriarchate of Constantinople by which the Emperor gained control over the Serbian Orthodox Church in Bosnia and Herzegovina in exchange for annual reimbursement. Serbs largely disapproved of Austro-Hungarian control over their religious institutions, and organised a struggle  to gain their religious autonomy. The struggle was ended in their favour in 1905. After gaining religious autonomy, the Serbs gathered around four political groups, out of which three become notable. The notable groups became known by the names of their official newspapers, the Srpska riječ (Serbian Word), the Petar Kočić's Narod i Otadžbina (the People and Fatherland) and the Lazar Dimitrijević's Dan (the Day). Later they demanded unity under one party, which was approved to them, so they founded the Serbian People's Organisation. As a relative majority, the Serbs were a dominant political factor, and as such they demanded Bosnia and Herzegovina's autonomy from the Ottoman Empire and Austria-Hungary. Serbian politics in Bosnia and Herzegovina was dominated by the three factions gathered around the three newspapers. The main problem of Serbian civic politics was the agrarian reaction. Serb peasants demanded to be liberated from feudal relations, while on the other hand they wanted to maintain cooperation with the Muslim People's Organisation in achieving national aspirations. The group gathered around Kočić's Narod i Otadžbina newspaper completely stood for Serbian peasantry against the Muslims in order to change the agrarian position of the peasantry. Kočić's group also banned any cooperation with the Austrian-Hungarian authorities. The group gathered around Dimitrijević also advocated a radical change of the agrarian relations and criticised the Serbian civic leadership for neglecting the peasantry, but they advocated cooperation with the Austro-Hungarian authorities in changing agrarian relations. The main goal of Serbian politics in Bosnia and Herzegovina was the removal of Austro-Hungarian authority in Bosnia and Herzegovina and annexation of Bosnia and Herzegovina to the Kingdom of Serbia. Their goals, however, were no obstacle to economic cooperation with the Austrian-Hungarian authorities.

In order to suppress national aspirations, the Austrian-Hungarian authorities tried to limit the activity of the Franciscans in Bosnia and Herzegovina. The Emperor and the Holy See discussed the reestablishment of the Catholic Church in Bosnia and Herzegovina. The Emperor's goal was to have the Church in Bosnia subordinated to his secular power within the Church. In the end, in 1881, the Holy See yielded, on condition that the Emperor did not explicitly mention his authority in a bulla which he, however, did. After establishing secular power over the Catholic Church in Bosnia and Herzegovina, the Emperor established the cathedral in Sarajevo and named Archbishop Dr. Josip Štadler as its head. Just before the occupation of Bosnia and Herzegovina, the Croatian Sabor asked the Emperor to alter the situation in Bosnia and Herzegovina so it could be unified with the Kingdom of Croatia-Slavonia and the Kingdom of Dalmatia. The Emperor refused to accept this demand and dismissed the Sabor. This was done as the Austrian-Hungarian authorities had a plan to isolate Bosnia and Herzegovina from its neighbouring Slavic countries, Croatia and Serbia, and to halt the national aspirations of the peoples in Bosnia and Herzegovina. The authorities did not only suppress the Croatian and Serbian names, but also any flags, coats of arms and folk songs. Any activity that would emphasise a common interest of Croats in Bosnia and Herzegovina and those in the Triune Kingdom was suppressed from the start. As they were unable to form a political party, especially under Kállay's administration, Croats formed various musical societies, reading rooms, schools, economic institutions and newspapers. The authorities forbade these societies from using the word "Croatian", even though they allowed use of the word "Serbian" for Serbian societies. Only later was the use of the word "Croatian" allowed. This official policy was pushed by Hungarian circles, especially under Kállay and his successor Stephan Burián von Rajecz. The goal of their policy was to weaken the Croatian position in Bosnia and Herzegovina by strengthening the Serbian position, in order to make unification of Bosnia and Herzegovina with Croatia less likely. Even though the authorities tried to isolate Bosnia and Herzegovina from the influence of neighbouring Slavic countries, Croatian people in Bosnia were nevertheless influenced by all three major political movements from Croatia, first the Illyrian movement, later Yugoslavism and Croatian nationalism.

In Croatian politics there were two factions and their formal political organising ran slowly. The fundamental reason for this Croatian political division was disagreement between the Franciscan Bosnian Province and the Archbishop's Chancery on the organisation of parishes within the archdiocese. The first initiative for creation of a Croatian political party came from the Croatian intelligentsia which gained support from the Franciscans. In 1908, after some preparations, it founded the Croatian People's Union with Ivo Pilar as its main ideologist. In its program, the HNZ advocated the annexation of Bosnia and Herzegovina by Austria-Hungary and its unification with the rest of the Croatian lands. In relations with the Serbs, the HNZ stood for a strict reciprocity, rejecting the idea of Bosnia and Herzegovina's unification with any other country or its autonomy. The HNZ did not demand any changes in social relations or changes in the agrarian relations. They tried to maintain good relations with the Muslim population, which was the only way to gain political strength. Because of this, they were harshly criticized by the Štadler's Croatian Catholic Association (HKU) that advocated an end to the serf system. Pilar believed that the HNZ's goals could only be achieved if Croats gained support from the Muslim population, and at the same time, he criticised Štadler for his Catholic propaganda. Štadler, who was Pilar's main opponent, believed that Catholic Croats should not be educated in any way other than as Catholics, thus advocating segregation between Catholics and Muslims. The HKU, like the HNZ, advocated unification of Bosnia and Herzegovina with other Croatian lands. It also promoted Christian morals, and unlike the HNZ, the HKU advocated the abolition of the serf system as they had no relations with the Muslims.

Annexation

Even though Bosnia and Herzegovina was still part of the Ottoman Empire, at least formally, the Austrian-Hungarian authorities had factual control over the country. Austria-Hungary waited for a chance to incorporate Bosnia and Herzegovina formally as well. Any action concerning Bosnia and Herzegovina depended on international opinion, which Austrian-Hungarian authorities were aware of. They used the Young Turk Revolution in the Ottoman Empire to finally annex Bosnia and Herzegovina. The Young Turk movement had gained support in mass protests throughout the Ottoman Empire during 1908, with their intention to restore the suspended Ottoman constitution. The Austrian-Hungarian authorities were afraid that the revolution could spread to Bosnia and Herzegovina, as it had support from the Bosnian Muslims and the Serbs, who supported the autonomy of Bosnia and Herzegovina within the Ottoman Empire. On 7 September 1908, the SNO and the MNO demanded that Bosnia and Herzegovina accept the constitution as part of the Ottoman Empire.

On 5 October the Emperor Franz Joseph announced the annexation of Bosnia and Herzegovina and ordered the Minister of Finance to compose a constitution for Bosnia and Herzegovina. The annexation was announced in Sarajevo two days later, on 7 October. This annexation led to an international crisis, which was solved on 26 February 1909 when the Ottoman Empire recognised the annexation having received material compensation and on the Austrian-Hungarian garrisons leaving the  Sanjak of Novi Pazar. By this, Bosnia and Herzegovina was formally under the Austrian-Hungarian sovereignty. On 21 March 1909, the German Empire sent an ultimatum to the Russian Empire to recognise the annexation, which Russia did immediately. Soon, the Kingdom of Serbia recognised the annexation on 31 March, the Kingdom of Montenegro doing so on 5 April.

The annexation caused unrest amongst the Muslim and Serb population. The Streifkorps (special counterinsurgency units) were reestablished in context of demonstrations in Serbia and in Montenegro against the annexation. The Muslims could not believe the sovereignty of the Sultan could be overturned with a proclamation, and that they were now ruled by a Christian emperor. The MNO and the SNO refused to give any official statement about the annexation. In Budapest they held a meeting on 11 October 1908 they issued the Message to the People of Bosnia and Herzegovina, where they stated that the people couldn't reconcile with the Austrian-Hungarian occupation in 30 years and asked for the people to remain calm and wait for the decision of the superpowers. Both parties announced that they would continue the struggle for the autonomy of Bosnia and Herzegovina. However, since all European countries had already recognised the annexation, the SNO and the MNO, who wanted to continue their activity as legitimate organisations, thus recognised the annexation; the SNO doing so in May 1909 and the MNO in February 1910. Unlike the Serbs and the Muslims, the Croats enthusiastically accepted the Austrian-Hungarian annexation. In an audience to the Emperor Franz Joseph, the representatives of the HNZ, Pilar, Nikola Mandić and Antonije Sunarić expressed the gratitude of the Croat people to the Emperor for the annexation at the end of October 1908. However, Croat enthusiasm did not endure, as Bosnia and Herzegovina failed to be joined with Croatia as expected.

Politics

In Bosnia and Herzegovina, every major ethnic group was represented by its political party. The Muslims were represented by the Muslim People's Organisation, the Serbs were represented by the Serbian People's Organisation, while the Croats were represented by the two political parties, the Croatian People's Union and the Croatian Catholic Association.

The Diet of Bosnia was established in 1910.

Parliamentary parties
 Croatian People's Union (Hrvatska narodna zajednica)
 Croatian Catholic Association (Hrvatska katolička udruga)
 Muslim People's Organisation (Muslimanska narodna organizacija)
 Serbian People's Organisation (Srpska narodna organizacija; Српска народна организација)

Non-parliamentary parties
 Muslim Progressive Party (Muslimanska napredna stranka)
 Muslim Democracy (Muslimanska demokracija)
 Serbian People's Independent Party (Srpska narodna nezavisna stranka)
 Socialdemocratic Party of Bosnia and Herzegovina (Socijaldemokratska stranka Bosne i Hercegovine)

Demographics

Administration

Bosnia and Herzegovina was governed jointly by Cisleithania (Austria) and the Lands of the Crown of Saint Stephen (Hungary) through the joint Ministry of Finance. In the Ministry of Finance, there was the Bosnian Office which controlled Bosnia and Herzegovina over the Government based in Sarajevo. The Government of Bosnia and Herzegovina was headed by a governor, who was also a commander of military forces based in Bosnia and Herzegovina. The government was also composed of the governor's deputy and chiefs of departments. At first, the government had only three departments, administrative, financial and legislative. Later, other departments, including construction, economic, education, religion, and technical, were founded as well.

In the 1910 Constitution, the Emperor proclaimed Bosnia and Herzegovina to be unique administrative territory under responsible leadership of the joint finance minister. With the implementation of the constitution, the position of Bosnia and Herzegovina did not change. It remained a corpus separatum administrated by Austria and Hungary. The constitution implemented three new constitutions, the Diet of Bosnia, the National Council and the municipal councils. The Diet of Bosnia had very limited legislative powers. The main legislative power was in hands of the emperor, parliaments in Vienna and Budapest and the joint minister of finance. The Diet of Bosnia only proposed decisions which needed to be approved by the parliaments in both Vienna and Budapest. The Diet also had no impact on the administrative-political institutions, the National Council and the municipal councils and also it didn't have right to participate in every decision making; the Diet could participate only in decisions that mattered Bosnia and Herzegovina exclusively, while decisions on armed forces, commercial and traffic connections, customs and similar matters, were made by the parliaments in Vienna and Budapest.

The Austrian-Hungarian authorities left the Ottoman division of Bosnia and Herzegovina untouched, they only changed the names of divisional units. Thus the Bosnia Vilayet was renamed to Reichsland, sanjaks were renamed to Kreise, kazas were renamed to Bezirke, while nahiyahs were renamed to Exposituren. There were six Kreise and 54 Bezirke. Head of the Reichsland was a Landeschef, heads of the Kreise were Kreisleiters and heads of the Bezirke were Bezirksleiters.

Governors

Religion
The region, which had been Islamised in the 15th and 16th centuries, largely retained its minority-Muslim population (which dropped from 38.7% in 1879 to 32.2% in 1910), as Austria-Hungary's December Constitution guaranteed freedom of religion and the authorities made no active attempts at conversion.

The emperor of Austria-Hungary had the ability to appoint and dismiss religious leaders and to control religious establishments financially through agreements created with the Pope, the Ecumenical Patriarchate, and the Sheikh-ul-Islam.

The occupation of Bosnia and Herzegovina led to great reforms of the Catholic Church in that country, after centuries in the Ottoman Empire. In 1881, Vrhbosna was elevated to an archdiocese, and the dioceses of Banja Luka and Mostar-Duvno were formed. Work began on the Sacred Heart Cathedral in Sarajevo in 1884 and was completed by 1889.

See also
Assassination of Archduke Franz Ferdinand of Austria
Bosnian-Herzegovinian Infantry
Ludwig Thallóczy

References
Citations

Bibliography
 
 

 
 
 

 
 
 

 
 

 
Bosnia and Herzegovina
Bosnia and Herzegovina
Former countries in the Balkans
Historical regions of Bosnia and Herzegovina
1870s in Bosnia and Herzegovina
.
.
.
States and territories established in 1878
States and territories disestablished in 1918
1878 establishments in Austria-Hungary
1918 disestablishments in Austria-Hungary

20th century in Bosnia and Herzegovina
Austria-Hungary–Serbia relations
Lands of the Empire of Austria (1867–1918)
Lands of the Kingdom of Hungary (1867–1918)